Michael Mutzel (born 27 September 1979) is a German former professional footballer who played as a midfielder. His most recent job was as sporting director of Hamburger SV until July 2022.

He represented Germany at the 1999 FIFA World Youth Championship.

After retirement
After retiring at the end of the 2011–12 season, Mutzel began his coaching career at 1899 Hoffenheim as assistant manager of the U17 team. He was appointed in a dual function, where he also was involved in the scouting and squad planning for the U15, U16 and U17. From 1 January 2013, he took over the U16's. In April 2013, he was also appointed as head of the youth department and became responsible for the sporty coordination of the U16 to U19 teams. He left the club on 28 October 2014 to join Greuther Fürth as a sporting director. He was at Greuther Fürth until the end of 2015.

On 2 February 2016, Mutzel returned to Hoffenheim and became responsible of scouting and game analysis. He was going to be the head of scouting and responsible for the game analysis. He left the club again at the end of March 2019 to join Hamburger SV as sporting director. He was released by Hamburg on 13 July 2022 after heavy criticism by Jonas Boldt.

Honours
VfB Stuttgart
UEFA Intertoto Cup: 2002

References

External links
 
 

1979 births
Living people
FC Augsburg players
Eintracht Frankfurt players
Eintracht Frankfurt II players
VfB Stuttgart players
Karlsruher SC players
VfL Wolfsburg II players
German footballers
Bundesliga players
2. Bundesliga players
People from Memmingen
Sportspeople from Swabia (Bavaria)
Germany youth international footballers
Association football midfielders
Footballers from Bavaria
Hamburger SV non-playing staff